Oswald Cunningham (born 1920, died before August 2011) was a Jamaican cricketer. He played in nine first-class matches for the Jamaican cricket team from 1938 to 1951.

See also
 List of Jamaican representative cricketers

References

External links
 

1920 births
Year of death missing
Jamaican cricketers
Jamaica cricketers
Sportspeople from Kingston, Jamaica